Margarete Bause (born 19 January 1959) is a German politician of Alliance 90/The Greens. She was a member of the Landtag of Bavaria from 1986 to 1990 and from 2003 to 2017 before serving as a member of the Bundestag from 2017 until 2021, where she was her parliamentary group's spokeswoman for human rights and humanitarian aid.

Early life and education 
Margarete Bause was born in Wertheim. After passing the Abitur in Landsberg, she studied German studies, political science and sociology at the University of Munich.

Political career
Bause became a member of the Green party in 1986 and was one of their state chairs in Bavaria from 1991 to 1993 and 1998 to 2003.

From 1986 until 1990 and from 2003 until 2017, Bause served as a member of the Landtag of Bavaria. In that capacity, she was her parliamentary group's co-chair. From 2004 until 2007, she was also part of the parliamentary inquiry into Monika Hohlmeier over allegations Hohlmeier – during her time as member of the state government – allowed party votes to be falsified and got jobs for friends.

Bause became a member of the German Bundestag in the 2017 elections, representing Munich. In parliament, she served on the Committee on Human Rights and Humanitarian Aid. She was also her parliamentary group's spokesperson on human rights. In addition to her committee assignments, she was a member of the German-Chinese Parliamentary Friendship Group and the German-Belarusian Parliamentary Friendship Group. From 2020, Bause served as co-chair of the Inter-Parliamentary Alliance on China (IPAC).

For the 2021 German federal election, Bause lost she lost the internal election for direct candidacy to Vaniessa Rashid in a contest vote for the Munich East constituency. Her place of 22 on the state list was not enough for her to return to the Bundestag.

Other activities

Corporate boards
 Umweltbank, Member of the Advisory Board

Non-profit organizations
 Munich School of Philosophy, Member of the Board of Trustees
 Wings of Hope Deutschland, Member of the Board of Trustees
 Bayerisches Amerikahaus, Member of the Advisory Board (2014-2017)
 Bayerischer Rundfunk, Member of the Broadcasting Council (1990-1998)

Political positions
Bause is active in the area of human rights in China and supportive of the Uyghurs; her constituency, Munich, is home to the majority of Uighurs living in Germany as well as to the headquarters of the World Uyghur Congress.

In 2014, Bause made headlines when — on a visit to China with a delegation from the Bavarian state parliament — she secretly met with dissident artist Ai Weiwei and later released photos of the meeting.

In August 2019, after asking the German government to support sending UN observers to Xinjiang province, Bause was denied entry to China. The remaining members of the German Bundestag delegation subsequently cancelled their planned China trip.

References

External links 
Personal homepage

1959 births
Living people
Ludwig Maximilian University of Munich alumni
Female members of the Bundestag
Members of the Bundestag for Bavaria
Members of the Landtag of Bavaria
Members of the Bundestag 2017–2021
Members of the Bundestag for Alliance 90/The Greens
People from Wertheim am Main
21st-century German women politicians